Oosporein is a toxic, bronze colored dibenzoquinone with the molecular formula C14H10O8. Oosporein was first extracted from various molds and has antibiotic, antiviral, cytotoxic, antifungal, and Insecticide properties.

References

Further reading 

 
 
 
 
 

Mycotoxins